Reggie Devon Barlow (born January 22, 1972) is a former American football player and coach who is currently the head coach and general manager for the DC Defenders of the XFL. Barlow served as the head football coach at Alabama State University from 2007 to 2014 and at Virginia State University from 2016 to 2021. He played professionally as wide receiver in the National Football League (NFL) for eight seasons, five for the Jacksonville Jaguars, two for the Tampa Bay Buccaneers, and one with the Oakland Raiders. He was used as a secondary wide receiver and punt returner. In 1997, Barlow led the NFL in punt return yards with 555 yards on 43 returns.

College career
A record-breaking receiver and kick returner, Barlow was recruited to Alabama State University by coach Houston Markham. During his senior year at Alabama State, Barlow caught 58 passes for 1,267 yards. The Montgomery, Alabama native and Sidney Lanier High School standout finished his collegiate career with 133 catches and 2,536 yards.

Professional career
Barlow was selected in the fourth round of the 1996 NFL Draft by the Jacksonville Jaguars.

In 1998, Barlow led the NFL in punt return yardage, with 43 returns for 555 yards and a touchdown and was named a Pro Bowl alternate. He still ranks among the Jaguars' career leaders for most punt returns (79), most punt return yards (967), and average per return (12.2), as well as among the all-time single-season leaders in punt return yardage (555 in 1998, tied for 37th best all-time as of 2014).  In the Jaguars 1998 playoff win against the New England Patriots, Barlow had 3 kickoff returns for 66 yards and 7 punt returns for 72.  One week later, Barlow returned 3 kickoffs for 118 yards, one of them an 88-yard runback, and 1 punt for 5 yards in a divisional round loss to the New York Jets. After five years in Jacksonville, Barlow joined the Oakland Raiders. In 2002, Barlow began his two-year tenure with the Tampa Bay Buccaneers, where he won a championship ring in Super Bowl XXXVII.

Barlow ended his NFL career with 39 receptions for 522 yards and 1 touchdown. His largest statistical contributions were made on kickoff and punt returns. Barlow returned 80 career kickoffs for 1,855 yards and 1 touchdown, and 158 punts for 1,639 yards and 2 touchdowns.

Coaching career

Alabama State 
Barlow joined the Alabama State Hornets football staff as quarterbacks coach in 2005. In his first season, Barlow served as mentor and tutor to future NFL second-round draftee Tarvaris Jackson.

In 2006, Barlow worked with a trio of quarterbacks without a single snap of college football experience between them. Under Barlow's tutelage, Alex Engram earned a Southwestern Athletic Conference (SWAC) Newcomer of the Week award and finished eighth in the conference in total offense.

After that season, Barlow was named interim head coach. A few weeks later, the interim title was removed. Barlow took over as head coach in 2007 and has compiled an overall record of 49–42 in eight season as head coach at Alabama State. In 2010, the Hornets went 7–5, claimed their fourth outright SWAC Eastern Divisional title and made their third trip to the league's championship game in eight seasons. In 2011, the Hornets improved to 8–3 winning the Turkey Day Classic over Tuskegee.

Barlow has coached a few current and former NFL players, including Seattle Seahawks quarterback Tarvaris Jackson, who was a member of the Super Bowl XLVIII Championship team, Cleveland Browns running back Isaiah Crowell, and Washington Redskins offensive tackle Terren Jones, as well as former Oakland Raiders receiver Greg Jenkins and former Baltimore Ravens linebacker Nigel Carr.

In 2014, after the completion of the school's football season, the Alabama State University Board of Trustees voted not to renew Barlow's contract. The move was seen as controversial because Barlow had signed a contract-extension and salary increase months prior and had already begun getting paid at the higher rate. Litigation is pending in the contract dispute. The Hornets football team finished 7–5 on the season. This was Barlow's fifth consecutive winning season and his 49 career wins rank him second all-time among coaches in program history.

George Washington Carver High School 
In December 2015, it was announced that Barlow had agreed in principle to become head football coach at George Washington Carver High School Columbus, Georgia. Just a few months later, however, Barlow was mentioned as a candidate for the head football coaching job at his alma mater, Sidney Lanier High School.

Virginia State 
In May 2016, Barlow accepted the Head Coaching position at Virginia State University. During his tenure at Virginia State, Barlow posted a 34-15 overall record and a 25-10 conference record. In 2017, he led the Trojans to their first unbeaten season in school history, going 10-0 and defeating Fayetteville State to win the CIAA championship and a berth in the Division II playoffs. Barlow resigned from Virginia State in March 2022.

XFL 
Barlow took a position with the XFL in March 2022. Barlow was initially expected to become the Head Coach for the San Antonio Franchise,  but in June 2022, it was instead reported that Barlow would coach the DC Defenders.

Personal life
Barlow is the father of three children: Ericka, Reggie Jr., and Simone, and the grandfather of one: Tyler Grace.

Head coaching record

College Career

XFL

References

External links
 Virginia State profile
 

1973 births
Living people
American football return specialists
American football wide receivers
Alabama State Hornets football coaches
Alabama State Hornets football players
Jacksonville Jaguars players
Tampa Bay Buccaneers players
Virginia State Trojans football coaches
Sidney Lanier High School alumni
Sportspeople from Montgomery, Alabama
Coaches of American football from Alabama
Players of American football from Montgomery, Alabama
African-American coaches of American football
African-American players of American football
20th-century African-American sportspeople
21st-century African-American sportspeople